Affalterbach is a municipality in the Ludwigsburg district in Baden-Württemberg, Germany.

History
Affalterbach became a possession of the County of Württemberg in 1322 and was placed under the jurisdiction of Marbach am Neckar. As it sat on the important road from Heilbronn to Ulm, the village was for a time abandoned.

Since 1976, the high-performance Mercedes-Benz tuning company AMG has been headquartered in Affalterbach, though it maintained its racing engine factory in Burgstetten. The original AMG logo pays homage to Affalterbach by including the city's apple tree coat of arms next to an engine valve and cam lobe.

Geography
The municipality (Gemeinde) of Affalterbach is located at the eastern extremity of the district of Ludwigsburg, in the German state of Baden-Württemberg, along the border with the Rems-Murr district. Elevation above sea level in the municipal area ranges from a high of  Normalnull (NN) to a low of  NN.

A portion of the Federally protected  nature reserve is located in Affalterbach's municipal area.

Politics
Affalterbach has one borough (Ortsteil), Affalterbach, and five villages: Birkachhof, Birkhau, Böllenhöfe, Steinächle, Wolfsölden. Affalterbach is a member of the Marbach am Neckar Municipal Association with the city of Marbach am Neckar and the municipalities of Benningen am Neckar and Erdmannhausen.

Coat of arms
Affalterbach's coat of arms portrays an apple tree, in green with red apples, rooted to a field of white and above a wavy, blue line at the base of the blazon. The apple tree is a reference to the name Affalterbach, which combines the old German word for "apple tree", affalter, with the word for "stream", bach.

Transportation
Affalterbach is connected to Germany's network of roadways by its local Landesstraßen and Kreisstraßen. Local public transportation is provided by the Verband Region Stuttgart.

References

External links

  (in German)

Württemberg